"Ye Hai Reshmi" (English: "It's Silky") is a Hindi song from the Indian film Mere Sanam (1965). It was composed by O. P. Nayyar and penned by Majrooh Sultanpuri. The song was sung by Asha Bhosle and picturised on Mumtaz. It went on to become one of the most popular Hindi songs. On Bhosle's 83rd birthday, DNA India declared it one of the best 7 songs she had performed.

References

1965 songs
Hindi-language songs
Indian songs
Asha Bhosle songs
Songs with music by O. P. Nayyar
Songs with lyrics by Majrooh Sultanpuri